Xi Jinping, the 18-20th General Secretary of the Chinese Communist Party and the 7th President of the People's Republic of China, has made 42 international trips to 69 countries since he assumed the leadership on 15 November, 2012.

Summary 
The number of visits per country where he has travelled are:

 One visit to: Mexico, Costa Rica, Cuba, Panama, Trinidad and Tobago, Ecuador, Peru, Chile, Finland, the United Kingdom, the Netherlands, Belgium, Switzerland, Monaco, Mongolia, Poland, Czech Republic, Belarus, Serbia, Egypt, Senegal, Republic of Congo, Rwanda, Tanzania, Zimbabwe, Mauritius, Myanmar, Turkey, United Arab Emirates, Iran, Turkmenistan, Pakistan, Bangladesh, Nepal, Sri Lanka, Maldives, Singapore, Malaysia, Brunei, Cambodia, Laos, North Korea, South Korea, Japan, Australia, New Zealand, Papua New Guinea, Fiji, Venezuela, and Thailand.
 Two visits to: Argentina, Brazil, Germany, Greece, Italy, Kyrgyzstan, Philippines, Portugal, Saudi Arabia, Tajikistan, and Vietnam.
 Three visits to: France, India, Indonesia, South Africa, Spain, and Uzbekistan.
 Four visits to: Kazakhstan, and the United States.
 Eight visits to: Russia.

2013

2014

2015

2016

2017

2018

2019

2020

2022

2023

Multilateral meetings

References 

Xi Jinping
Xi, Jinping
China presidential visits
Xi Jinping visits
Xi Jinping